"Upuan" is the first single of Filipino rapper Gloc-9, from his fourth album Matrikula. The song features Jeazell Grutas, vocalist of the band Zelle.

Chart performance
"Upuan" is one of Gloc-9's most successful songs in terms of chart performance, especially in local radio countdowns. The song reached number 17 in the Myx Hit Chart, number 3 in Pinoy Myx Countdown, and both number 1 in The i10 Countdown and Saturday Top 20.

Music video
The music video was premiered on Myx music channel on June 29, 2009 and directed by J. Pacena II (who also directed Gloc-9's "Lando", "Balita", "Pangarap" and "Torpedo"). The video was also produced under Sony Music Philippines. It stars (aside from Gloc-9 and Jeazell) Agnes and Paul De Vera, Tom Sembrano and Armand Bentigan.

Awards and Issues
The song received numerous awards, most of them from the 23rd Awit Awards. The song won in the Best Collaboration, Song of the Year, Best Rap and Best Engineered Recording categories in the 23rd Awit Awards. The song was also nominated in the Best Musical Arrangement category from the same award-giving body and also won as Best Urban Video at the Myx Music Awards 2010. While praised by the mainstream listeners, particularly the youth, the song was at some point, scorned by politicians and even the president, as the song allegedly contains subliminal messages and undertones which indirectly accuses the latter as a power-hungry leader. Also, the song had a more negative vibe to the president, particularly during the time when the effects of the "Hello Garci Scandal" and other anomalous schemes began leaking out and exacting its toll to the Filipinos, coupled with an ever winding-down satisfaction ratings and a failing political career as a head of state. The song, in the clearest sense, is a critique of the president's administration in general.

References

2009 singles
Gloc-9 songs
2009 songs
Sony Music singles
Songs written by Gloc-9
Tagalog-language songs